"Infatuation" is a 1984 song by Rod Stewart from his thirteenth studio album Camouflage, written by Stewart, Duane Hitchings and Rowland Robinson released as the first single from the album. 

It features guitar playing by Jeff Beck, who makes a cameo in the video. It had two different B-sides. The US B-side was "She Won't Dance With Me", which is from his 1980 album Foolish Behaviour while the UK B-side, "Three Time Loser", is from his 1975 album Atlantic Crossing.

Music video
The song's video, directed by Jonathan Kaplan, is a story filmed mostly in black in white.  In the video, a woman (played by Kay Lenz) moves into an apartment complex where Stewart lives.  Shortly after she settles in, Stewart is accosted by the woman's bodyguard (played by Mike Mazurki) asking about her, showing him a picture of her with two mobsters, one of the faces covered by the bodyguard's thumb; Stewart denies knowing the woman, though his apartment walls are covered with numerous pictures he took of the woman in various stages of dress (and undress); he is constantly snapping additional pictures or peering into the woman's apartment with his binoculars.

Eventually Stewart's obsession with the woman gets him in trouble; he is caught with his binoculars by the woman's bodyguard, who punches him in the face.  After Stewart falls back on his pillow the film changes from black and white to color, suggesting a dream sequence.  The last scene takes a surreal turn, showing Stewart standing at a moving carousel with Lenz trapped in the center while one of the two mobsters (Dick Miller), riding a mount, taunts Stewart.

The video has two different endings. One ending shows the woman waving goodbye to Stewart as she and the other mobster (the one whose face was covered by the bodyguard's thumb in the picture) drive away in a blue convertible, leaving Stewart riding the carousel alone.  The other has the mobster driving away alone as Stewart and Lenz ride the carousel together in each other's arms. In the first ending might, other 'mobster' is actually Stewart with his hair slicked down.

Mazurki later said that he got more fame in the making of this video than in any of the feature films or TV shows in which he'd starred.

Charts
The song reached #6 on Billboard's Hot 100 charts.  On the US dance charts, "Infatuation" was the last of five entries to make the chart, peaking at #19.

Chart history

Parody
In the season 29 episode "Springfield Splendor" of The Simpsons, Kipp Lennon sings "Collaboration".

References

1984 singles
Rod Stewart songs
Songs written by Rod Stewart
Song recordings produced by Michael Omartian
1984 songs
Warner Records singles